"Dancing in the Dark" is a popular American song, with music by Arthur Schwartz and lyrics by Howard Dietz, that was introduced by John Barker with Tilly Losch dancing in the 1931 revue The Band Wagon.  The song was first recorded by Bing Crosby on August 19, 1931 with Studio Orchestra directed by Victor Young, staying on the pop charts for six weeks, peaking at #3, and helping to make it a lasting standard. 
The 1941 recording by Artie Shaw and His Orchestra earned Shaw one of his eight gold records at the height of the Big Band era of the 1930s and 1940s. Shaw's 1940 arrangement was a collaboration between Shaw and his chief arranger, Lenny Hayton, who was also an important Music Director, Music Arranger and Orchestrator at MGM until 1953. 

It was subsequently featured in the classic 1953 MGM musical The Band Wagon and has since come to be considered part of the Great American Songbook. In the film it is orchestrally performed to a ballet dance by Fred Astaire and Cyd Charisse set in Central Park. The song is given a 'sensual and dramatic' orchestration by Conrad Salinger , choreographed by Michael Kidd.

Other recordings
Al Bowlly as part of a medley on a 78rpm record Al Bowlly Remembers Medley Part 1 (November 11, 1938) (See Al Bowlly Discography)
Charlie Parker - included in the album Charlie Parker with Strings (recorded  July 1950, released in 1954)
Fred Astaire - recorded for his album The Astaire Story (1952)
Jo Stafford - included in her 1953 album Broadway's Best
Ray Conniff - included in his album 'S Wonderful! (1956)
Gordon MacRae - for his 1957 album Motion Picture Soundstage
Sarah Vaughan - for her album Great Songs from Hit Shows (1957)
Dorothy Ashby covered the song in 1958 on Hip Harp
Julian "Cannonball" Adderley - in the 1958 album Somethin' Else
Duke Ellington and His Orchestra - on the album Ellington Indigos in 1958
Patti Page- included in her 1958 album I've Heard That Song Before
Jane Morgan - in the album Great Songs from the Great Shows of the Century (1959)
Frank Sinatra - included on his 1959 album Come Dance with Me
Bert Kaempfert - for his 1960 album Dancing in Wonderland
Tony Bennett recorded it twice, first in 1961 for the album My Heart Sings, and then in 1993 for the Steppin' Out album
Mel Tormé - for his 1961 album My Kind of Music
Connie Stevens on her 1962 CD From Me To You
Bill Evans - for the 1964 album Trio 64
Johnny Mathis - for his album Love Is Everything (1965)
Ella Fitzgerald sang it live at a concert in 1970 and this has been issued on the album Ella in Budapest
Bea Wain - included in the album My Reverie (1982)
Barry Manilow - for his 1991 album Showstoppers
Buddy DeFranco - included in the album Chip Off The Old Bop (recorded 1992, released in 1992)
Diana Krall - for her album The Look of Love (2001)
Diamanda Galas - included in the 2003 album La serpenta cantaIn popular culture
Steve Martin was the host for the final episode of season 14 of Saturday Night Live''. In the opening monologue, he visibly struggled to hold back tears as he paid tribute to Gilda Radner, who had died of cancer on the afternoon before the broadcast. Martin and Radner's "Dancing in the Dark" sketch, originally shown in episode 64 in 1978, was also offered in tribute.

Notes

External links
History of the song at jazzstandards

1931 songs
Songs from musicals
Songs with lyrics by Howard Dietz
Songs with music by Arthur Schwartz
Fred Astaire songs